Amin Saleh Majaj (March 21, 1921, Ramallah – January 2, 1999, East Jerusalem) was a titular mayor of Jerusalem, formerly the neighborhoods of East Jerusalem that were occupied and annexed by Jordan during the years 1949–1967, and later occupied and annexed by Israel in the Six-Day War. 

Al-Majaj held the position from 1994 to his death after Mayor Ruhi al-Khatib died on 5 July 1994. A year later Jordanian businessman Zaki Al-Ghul was selected as successor to this position, which does not entail direct responsibility for municipal services. The position is not recognized by Israel.

Amin Majaj was a physician and a public servant. In the late 1940s and 1950s he made detailed research into malnutrition and its attendant diseases among children in the Palestinian refugee camps, and devised treatments for them.

Born in Ramallah in 1921 to a well known Christian family that belonged to the Anglican Episcopal Church, Majaj was educated at St George's High School in Jerusalem (part of the Anglican bishopric), going on to the American University of Beirut in 1945 and to the University of London, where he studied medicine, specialising in child health.
 
Back in Jordan, Majaj was confronted by a new and challenging situation. There were now half a million refugees from Palestine in Jordanian camps, kept alive by UNRWA rations. Many children were dying from gastroenteritis and deficiency diseases.

Majaj realised that malnutrition among mothers was making breastfeeding ineffective and that lack of animal protein in the rations was the cause of iron-deficiency anemia, and protein deficiency resulting in diseases such as kwashiorkor. The remedy, a diet rich in animal proteins and vitamin B12 injections, was easier to recommend than to implement.

His research continued until the children's wards in the Augusta Victoria Hospital in Jerusalem, where Majaj worked as head of the paediatrics department from 1950 to 1991, sustained a direct hit when the Israelis invaded the West Bank during the 1967 war.

Majaj published the results of his research in the American Journal of Clinical Nutrition in 1966, in the Gazette of the Egyptian Paediatric Association of 1960 and in British and German medical journals. He was paediatrician at the Makased Islamic Hospital in Jerusalem from 1967 to 1982 (director from 1977), as well as on the board of hospitals in Gaza and Nablus.

He was on the Jerusalem municipal council from 1950 and at the time of his death was acting mayor of East Jerusalem. He also served as a member of the Jordanian parliament from 1967 to 1988, and as Minister of Health in 1957 and in 1964. Among his many other responsibilities he took over direction of Musa Alami's Arab Development Society in Jericho, which took boys out of Palestinian refugee camps to teach them agricultural and other skills.

In 1947 he married Betty Dagher from Lebanon, who is now director of the Princess Basma Centre for Disabled Children in Jerusalem.

Amin Majaj, physician: born Ramallah, Palestine 21 March 1921; married 1947 Betty Dagher (one son, three daughters); died Jerusalem 2 January 1999.

References

1921 births
1999 deaths
Mayors of Jerusalem
Palestinian Anglicans
Mayors of places in the State of Palestine
People from Ramallah